Laurie is a surname, derived from the given name Laurence. Notable people with the surname include:

Annie Laurie (musician) (1924-2006), African-American jump blues and rhythm and blues singer
Arthur Pillans Laurie (1861-1949), Scottish chemist, pioneer of the scientific analysis of paintings 
Ben Laurie, founding director of The Apache Software Foundation, core team member of OpenSSL
Cy Laurie (1926-2002), English jazz clarinettist and bandleader
Daine Laurie (born 1999), Indigenous Australian professional rugby league footballer
Eleanor Mary Ord Laurie (1919–2009), British mammalogist
David Laurie (1833–1897), violin collector
Greg Laurie (born 1952), Senior Pastor of Harvest Christian Fellowship in Riverside, California
Hugh Laurie (born 1959), British actor, voice artist, comedian, writer, musician, recording artist and director
James Laurie (1811–1875), American engineer, a founder of the American Society of Civil Engineers
Jim Laurie (born 1947), American writer, journalist, and broadcaster known for his work in Asia
Joan Werner Laurie (1920–1964), founder and editor until her death of SHE magazine
Joe Laurie, Jr. (1892–1954), vaudeville monologist who later performed on Broadway
John Laurie (1897–1980), Scottish actor born in Dumfries, Scotland
John Wimburn Laurie (1835–1912), soldier and political figure in Nova Scotia, Canada and England
Louis Laurie (1917–2002), American boxer
Malcolm Laurie (1866–1932), Scottish zoologist 
Mark Laurie (photographer) (born 1955), Canadian photographer
Mark Laurie (rugby league) (born 1962), Australian rugby league footballer in the 1980s
Meshel Laurie, Australian comedian and radio-television personality
Miracle Laurie (born 1981), American actress
Nancy Walton Laurie (born 1951), daughter of Bud Walton of Walmart
Park Laurie (1846–1928), politician in South Australia
Percy Laurie (1880–1962), British Army major general and police officer
Peter Laurie (1778–1861), British politician who served as Lord Mayor of London
Piper Laurie (born 1932), American actress of stage and screen
Ran Laurie (1915–1998), British physician, rowing champion and Olympic gold medallist; also father of Hugh Laurie
Sir Robert Laurie, 6th Baronet KCB (1764–1848), an officer of the Royal Navy
Robert Douglas Laurie (1874–1953), founder and first president of the Association of University Teachers.
Robert Laurie (bishop) (died 1677), seventeenth-century Church of Scotland prelate
Robert Laurie (rugby league), Australian former rugby league footballer
Robert Laurie Morant (1863–1920), English administrator and educator
Robert Peter Laurie (1835–1905), British Conservative Party politician
Simon Somerville Laurie (1829–1909), Scottish educator 
Stephen P. Laurie, British amateur astronomer
Steve Laurie (born 1982), Australian footballer
Thomas Laurie (1938–2020), former Chairman of the Traverse Theatre
Thomas Werner Laurie (1866–1944), London publisher

See also
Lourie
Lurie

Patronymic surnames

lv:Laurie